The  San Jose SaberCats season was the 13th season for the franchise. They defeated the Columbus Destroyers 55–33 in ArenaBowl XXI to capture their 3rd Arena Football League title. San Jose ended the year on a 13-game winning streak including playoff games.

Schedule

Coaching
Darren Arbet entered his ninth season as SaberCats head coach.

Final roster

Stats

Offense

Quarterback

Running backs

Wide receivers

Touchdowns

Defense

Special teams

Kick return

Kicking

San Jose SaberCats
San Jose SaberCats seasons
ArenaBowl champion seasons
San